Guasca is a Colombian town and municipality in the Guavio Province, part of the Cundinamarca Department located approximately 55 km from Bogotá passing through the town of La Calera, Cundinamarca or 65 km passing through Sopó. Guasca borders the municipalities Tocancipá and Guatavita in the north, Junín in the east, in the south La Calera and in the west Sopó.

History 
Before the Spanish conquest of the Muisca of the central highlands of the Colombian Andes, the Altiplano Cundiboyacense, the area was inhabited by the Muisca who spoke Chibcha. Guasca was ruled by a cacique who was loyal to the cacique of Guatavita. In the religion of the Muisca, the Siecha Lakes were considered sacred.

Etymology 
According to friar and Muisca scholar Bernardo de Lugo the name Guasca is derived from guâ, "mountain range" and shucâ; "skirt". The name thus means "skirt of the mountain range", indicating the position of the village with respect to the Eastern Ranges of the Colombian Andes.

Economy 
Main economical activities of Guasca are agriculture; potatoes, carrots, flowers and strawberries and dairy farming.

Tourism 
Guasca is known for ecotourism and has access to Chingaza Natural National Park. Other natural areas are Los Encenillos and the Siecha Lakes. One of the oldest hotels and restaurants in the area is Café la Huerta.

Born in Guasca 
 Mariano Ospina Rodríguez - president of the Granadine Confederation

Trivia 
 The plant Galinsoga parviflora is called "Guasca(s)" in Colombia and an essential ingredient of the soup ajiaco
 The spiders Anapis guasca, Deinopis guasca, and moth Dognina guasca are found in and named after Guasca

Gallery

References

External links 

 Café la Huerta

Municipalities of Cundinamarca Department
Populated places established in 1600
1600 establishments in the Spanish Empire
Muisca Confederation
Muysccubun